East Kutai Regency is a regency of East Kalimantan province, Indonesia. It has an area of 35,747.50 km2 and had a population of 253,904 at the 2010 census and 434,459 at the 2020 census; the official estimate as at mid 2021 was 449,161. The town of Sangatta is the capital of the regency.

There are several coal mining companies with concessions around this regency, including Kaltim Prima Coal, one of the largest coal mining companies in Indonesia. The regency also contains one of the largest coal mine in Asia - the East Kutai coal mine.

East Kutai is home to the world's oldest known figurative art at Lubang Jeriji Saléh.

Administrative Districts 
East Kutai Regency is divided into eighteen districts (kecamatan), tabulated below with their areas and their 2010 and 2020 census populations.  The table also includes the locations of the district administrative centres, the number of administrative villages (rural desa and urban kelurahan) in each district, and its postal codes.

Notes: (a) except the village of Kelinjau Ulu (which has a postcode of 75556). (b) includes 16 islands off the coast of Kalimantan. (c) includes 8 islands off the coast of Kalimantan.

Climate
Sangatta, the seat of the regency has a tropical rainforest climate (Af) with moderate rainfall from July to October and heavy rainfall from November to June.

References

External links